Sophie Anna Ward (born 30 December 1964) is an English stage and screen actress, and a writer of non-fiction and fiction. As an actress, she played Elizabeth Hardy, the female lead in Barry Levinson's Young Sherlock Holmes (1985), and in other feature film roles including in Cary Joji Fukunaga's period drama Jane Eyre (2011), and Jane Sanger's horror feature, Swiperight (2020). In 1982 she had a role in the Academy Award-winning best short film, A Shocking Accident. On television she played Dr Helen Trent in British police drama series Heartbeat from 2004 to 2006, the character Sophia Byrne in the series Holby City from 2008 to 2010, the role of Lady Ellen Hoxley in the series Land Girls from 2009 to 2011, and that of Lady Verinder in the mini-series The Moonstone (2016). She has had a variety of other roles on stage and in short and feature films.

Ward returned to higher education, earning a PhD from Goldsmiths, University of London, in 2019, in English and Comparative Literature, focusing on the intersection between literature and philosophy, including the use of narrative and thought experiments in philosophy, the philosophy of mind in particular. She has written for The Guardian, The Times, and The Spectator, won the 2018 Royal Academy Pin Drop Award for her short story "Sunbed", and had her first novel, Love and Other Thought Experiments (2020), longlisted for both the Desmond Elliott Prize and the Booker Prize in its publication year. She and her wife, Korean-American poet and writer, Rena Brannan, divide their time between England and the United States.

Early life and education
Sophie Anna Ward was born in Hammersmith, London, in 1964, the eldest of the three daughters of Alexandra (née Malcolm) and actor Simon Ward, one of whom, Kitty, went on to marry to comedian Michael McIntyre. In childhood, Sophia Ward trained at the Anna Scher Theatre. She earned a BA honours degree in English with Philosophy from the Open University.

She returned to higher education, earning a PhD in English and Comparative Literature at Goldsmiths, University of London in 2019, where, according to Ward, her research focused on "thought experiments in philosophy of mind and the use of narrative in philosophy, looking at issues of consciousness and AI, and the meeting between literature and philosophy."

Acting career
Ward started work as an actress when she was aged 10, and has worked in film, television and theatre. She trained as a dancer under ballerina Merle Park. In 1983, at the age of 19, she had a brief, non-speaking role at the very end of the Tony Scott vampire movie The Hunger; in the credits, her character is listed as "Girl In London House". Another of Ward's early film roles was in the film Young Sherlock Holmes (1985), directed by Barry Levinson. Other early films included Full Circle (1977), Return to Oz (1985) playing beautiful princess Mombi II, Little Dorrit (1987) and A Summer Story (1988), and she also portrayed a dancer in Roxy Music's 1982 music video "Avalon".

She has appeared in several Glasgow Citizens' Theatre productions including Private Lives (as Amanda), Don Carlos (as Queen Elizabeth) and most strikingly in Hamlet as Ophelia.

Her later films include Out of Bounds (2003), in which she co-stars with Sophia Myles and Celia Imrie, and Book of Blood (2008), co-starring Jonas Armstrong and Reg Fuller. She also appeared in Cary Fukunaga's Jane Eyre (2011).

Her television work includes the mini-series A Dark-Adapted Eye with Helena Bonham Carter and the fantasy Dinotopia. From 2004 until 2006, Ward had the recurring role of Dr Helen Trent in long-running ITV drama Heartbeat. In 2008, Ward joined the cast of Holby City in a recurring role as Sophia Byrne. She appeared in the BBC series Land Girls from 2009 to 2011.

Ward had long been considered a "Face of the 1980s" as a Vogue model.

Acting awards and recognition

Ward acted in the 1982 Academy Award-winning short film, A Shocking Accident. Her role in the first (2009) series of Land Girls earned her a regional (Midlands) RTS Television Award for best acting performance (by a female) in that year.

Writing
Especially since beginning her advanced academic work, Ward has been writing professionally, including for newspapers The Guardian, The Times, and The Spectator, and the online journalism network, The Conversation. While undertaking her post-graduate study, Ward wrote a short work, "Sunbed", which won the 2018 Royal Academy Pin Drop Award for new writers, in the short story category.

Ward's debut novel, Love and Other Thought Experiments was published in 2020 by Corsair, an imprint of Little, Brown Book Group. It was longlisted for both the Desmond Elliott Prize and the Booker Prize in its publication year.

Activism
Ward has become known as an LGBT activist, and her 2014 long-form essay, a strong statement regarding equality of marriage rights, was published by Guardian Shorts, The Guardian'''s e-book publishing house. It later appeared in serialised form in issues of the newspaper. Ward has hosted several of the annual European Diversity Awards, including in 2016, 2019, and 2021.

Personal life
Ward married veterinary surgeon Paul Hobson in 1988, and the couple have two sons, born in 1989 and 1993. After Ward became involved with Korean-American poet and writer Rena Brannan, and in 1996 Ward came out as a lesbian, Hobson and Ward divorced. Ward and Brannan had a civil partnership ceremony in 2005, followed by marriage after it was legalised in 2014.

Ward and Brannan divide their time between England and the United States.

Ward's brother-in-law is comedian Michael McIntyre.

Written works
  (Novel)
  (Non-fiction)

Filmography
Film
 Full Circle – 1977
 Return to Oz – 1985, as "Sofia" 
 Young Sherlock Holmes – 1985
 A Summer Story – 1988
 Aria – 1987
 Little Dorrit – 1988
 Young Toscanini – 1988
  – 1989
 Una vita scellerata, a film on Benevenuto Cellini) – 1989
 Seduction of a Priest – 1990
  Wuthering Heights – 1992
 Waxwork II: Lost in Time – 1992
 Crime & Punishment – 1993
 The Big Fall – 1997
 Bella Donna – 1998
 Crime and Punishment – 2002
 Out of Bounds – 2003
 Book of Blood – 2008
 Jane Eyre – 2011
 The Moonstone – 2016

Television
 Shadows anthology series – (1975), Series 1, "The Other Window". (as "Jan")
 Too Old to Fight – 1981
  – 1987
 Casanova – 1987
 Miss Marple (TV series): A Caribbean Mystery – 1989
 The Shell Seekers – 1989
 The Strauss Dynasty – 1990
 Class of '61 – 1991
 Events at Drimaghleen – 1991
 A Dark-Adapted Eye – 1992
 Taking Liberty – 1993
 Chiller (TV series): Prophecy – 1994
 MacGyver: Lost Treasure of Atlantis – 1994
 A Village Affair – 1995
 Legacy – 1999
 Crusade – 1999
 The Inspector Lynley Mysteries – 2001
 Dinotopia – 2002
 Heartbeat - 2004-2006, series 14-15 (as "Dr Helen Trent")
 Holby City – 2008
 Land Girls – 2009, Series 1 (awarded Best Acting Performance (Female) in the 2010 Royal Television Regional Awards [Midlands])
 Lewis – 2010
 Land Girls – 2010, Series 2
 New Tricks – 2010, Series 7
 Hustle – 2012
 A Very British Scandal - Janet Kidd - 2021

Guest appearances
 Waxwork II – 1992
 The Nanny– 1999 ("The Wedding Episode", "The Fran in the Mirror", "The Hanukkah Episode") 
 Crusade  – 1999 ("The Path of Sorrows")
 Rhona – 2000 ("The Fridge") 
 Peak Practice – 2001 ("Blind spot")

Short films
 "Avalon" – 1982, music video for Roxy Music
 A Shocking Accident – 1982 (Academy Award-winner for best short film)
 Rock-a-bye Baby – 1983
 A Prayer for the Dying – 1984
 The Malady – 1985
 Chinese Whispers – 1998
 Bubblegum – 2004
 Missing Link – 2009
 David Rose – 2011

Child performances
 The Chester Mysteries – 1974
 Shadows – 1975 ("The Other Window")
 Full Circle – 1975 ("The Haunting of Julia" US) 
 The Copter Kids – 1976
 Ibsen: The Wild Duck – 1977
 The Brensham People – 1977
 Too Old to Fight'' – 1980
 The Lords of Discipline – 1983
 The Hunger – 1983

References

External links 
 Sophie Ward's theatre blog
 
 

1964 births
Living people
Actresses from London
People from Hammersmith
English film actresses
English stage actresses
English television actresses
English lesbian actresses
Alumni of the Open University
British lesbian actresses
English LGBT actors
20th-century English LGBT people
21st-century English novelists
21st-century English women
21st-century English LGBT people